Ted Horn (February 27, 1910 – October 10, 1948), born Eylard Theodore Von Horn, was an American racecar driver.  He won the AAA National Championship in 1946, 1947 and 1948 and collected 24 wins, 12 second-place finishes and 13 third-place finishes in 71 major American open-wheel races prior to his death at the DuQuoin State Fairgrounds at the age of 38.

Early life and career
Ted Horn was born in Cincinnati, Ohio.  Horn's family moved several times during his childhood, finally settling in Los Angeles.  At 15 years of age he found work at the Los Angeles Times newspaper.

On his way to work one day Horn was pulled over for speeding.  Try as he might he could not get out of this situation easily.  The policeman gave him a fairly unusual punishment for the infraction.  The young man was to travel to a race track called San Jose Speedway where usually there were more cars than drivers, then find a willing car owner to let him drive.  Once he got all the speed he had out of his system he could pick up his impounded car.  Horn would heed the advice of the policeman and would eventually return to pick up his car.  But he found a new passion in auto racing and would never "get the speed he had out of his system."

When Horn began his racing career in earnest at a California race track called Legion Ascot Speedway he found he had much to learn as he was usually the slowest driver on the track.  Eventually a few of the drivers gave him pointers on how to pick up his lap times which started to help develop his driving style.  He suffered a serious racing accident which broke his foot and burned his back and kept him on the mend for several weeks.  At the urging of his parents he promised to abandon the sport.  He fully intended to abide by his parents wishes but after three years he began racing again.

Horn steadily improved to the point he finished a close second in a race to Indianapolis 500 winner Louis Meyer.  Meyer was impressed with young Ted Horn, who felt he now needed to travel to the midwest and eastern part of the United States where there were more race tracks and opportunities for a young race driver.

Championship car career
In 1934 in preparation for the Indianapolis 500 Horn practiced in a car called the Mick Special.  However, he did not feel comfortable with the car and decided against trying to qualify it.  Throughout that summer he campaigned a sprint car on a rigorous schedule once again in the east and midwest.  He was successful enough to attract the attention of Harry Miller.  Preston Tucker was putting together an ambitious effort with Miller and the Ford Motor Company for the 1935 Indianapolis 500.  When asked by Miller, Horn accepted a ride in one of the new Miller Ford V8 cars.  He did make the field for the 1935 Indy 500.  Unfortunately a flaw in the design of the car would eventually result in the steering gear in the car to eventually freeze up and the car being impossible to steer.  He dropped out of the race after 145 laps, most of which was spent fighting the steering problem.

After his first Indy 500 Horn felt that he failed to make an impression.  Former driver turned car owner Harry Hartz felt otherwise about the young driver and thought that he did an excellent job of driving under difficult circumstances.  Hartz was impressed enough to offer Horn a chance to drive his car in the 1936 Indy 500, which he gladly accepted.  Hartz, consistent finisher in his years driving the Indianapolis 500, took Horn under his wing.  The combination Hartz and Horn was immediately a potent one as Horn would finish second on his first race with Hartz.  He had two more Indianapolis 500 starts with the Hartz machine and finished third and fourth respectively.

Horn continued to race with moderate success through the 1930s, with second, third and fourth places at the Indianapolis 500 and placing well in the championship standings.

He volunteered for World War II service but was rejected on the basis of his racing injuries.  After the cessation of hostilities, racing began again on a limited basis in 1945, and Horn won all seven races he entered that year.  Further success came his way in the three subsequent years, giving him the National Championship in 1946, 1947 and 1948; this was the first three-time win.  He never won the Indy 500, but achieved nine straight top-four finishes.

Death
In a race at DuQuoin, Illinois on October 10, 1948, Horn was involved in a serious accident during the second lap.  He was taken to the hospital alive but died a short time later.  He was 38.  The AAA Championship Car race (now USAC Silver Crown) is known as the Ted Horn 100 in his memory.

Complete AAA Championship Car results

Indianapolis 500 results

Horn has the best 10-year streak of finishes in Indianapolis 500 history.
Over his Indianapolis 500 career, Horn completed 1944 out of a possible 2000 laps (97%).
Although Horn started the 1947 race from the pole position, his was the 3rd fastest qualifying speed behind Bill Holland and Duke Nalon.
Horn qualified for the prestigious 100 mph Club a record eight times.

Awards
He was named to the National Sprint Car Hall of Fame in 1991.
He was inducted in the Motorsports Hall of Fame of America in 1993.

References

External links
Indy's unluckiest legends: Part 1 - Racer, Robin Miller, 20 May 2013

1909 births
1948 deaths
Champ Car champions
Sportspeople from Cincinnati
Racing drivers from Ohio
Indianapolis 500 drivers
Indianapolis 500 polesitters
AAA Championship Car drivers
Racing drivers who died while racing
Sports deaths in Illinois
National Sprint Car Hall of Fame inductees